Benjamin Coel Eaves (born March 27, 1982) is an American former professional ice hockey center. He is currently the strength and conditioning coach for the Cleveland Monsters of the American Hockey League (AHL) - where his father and former National Hockey League (NHL) player Mike Eaves is head coach. His brother Patrick played over 600 games in the NHL.

Playing career 
Eaves went to high school at Shattuck-St. Mary's school in Faribault, Minnesota. Eaves was drafted 131st overall by the Pittsburgh Penguins in the 2001 NHL Entry Draft.  He spent four seasons at Boston College before turning pro in 2004. He signed an entry-level contract with the Penguins, but with the 2004–05 NHL season locked out and eventually cancelled, he split the season with the AHL's Wilkes-Barre/Scranton Penguins and the ECHL's Wheeling Nailers.  He missed majority of 2005–06 season and entire 2006–07 season recovering from knee injuries.

In November 2007 he signed for the Espoo Blues in SM-liiga where he played rest of the season, although missing majority of it due to several injuries. He continued in the team for the following season. On 13 December 2008 he took a break due to injury, he made his comeback on 28 January 2009.

During the SM-liiga playoffs 2009 Ben Eaves broke the record of Kari Jalonen (season 1980/81) and Hannes Hyvönen (2007/08) for the most points scored during the playoffs (21 points). Eaves managed to score 24 points (4 goals and 20 assists) in 13 games with the Espoo Blues.

On July 21, 2009, Eaves signed a one-year, two-way contract with the Nashville Predators. On November 2, 2009 Eaves left the Predators' AHL affiliate Milwaukee Admirals and announced his retirement from hockey due to a lingering knee injury.

In the following season, however, he came out of retirement and joined Jokerit of Finnish SM-liiga in August 2010. In his return to Finland, Eaves successfully established himself amongst Jokerit's scoring forwards. He was selected as the MVP of the European trophy tournament of the 2011–12 season. In his third season with Jokerit, Eaves was again plagued by injury, suffering a concussion before briefly returning for the playoffs.

In preparation for the 2013–14 season with Jokerit, Eaves suffered a relapse of concussion symptoms and on August 16, 2013, announced his retirement from professional hockey for a second time, moving on to be Assistant Director of Hockey and U18 Coach for the Ohio AAA Blue Jackets in Columbus, Ohio.

In 2019, he joined the Cleveland Monsters of the American Hockey League (AHL) - where his father is the head coach - as the strength and conditioning coach.

Career statistics

Regular season and playoffs

International

Awards and honors

References

External links

Ben Eaves's Player profile at Elite Prospects

1982 births
Living people
American men's ice hockey centers
Boston College Eagles men's ice hockey players
Espoo Blues players
Ice hockey people from Minneapolis
Jokerit players
Milwaukee Admirals players
People from Faribault, Minnesota
Pittsburgh Penguins draft picks
Wheeling Nailers players
Wilkes-Barre/Scranton Penguins players
AHCA Division I men's ice hockey All-Americans
Sports coaches from Minneapolis
NCAA men's ice hockey national champions